São Nicolau is a village in the central part of São Tomé Island in São Tomé and Príncipe. Its population is 118 (2012 census). It lies in a mountainous area, 3 km southwest of Monte Café.

Population history

References

Populated places in Mé-Zóchi District